RiTa is an open-source software toolkit for generative writing and English natural language, originally developed using the Java language by Daniel C. Howe and collaborators, and later implemented in JavaScript as rita.js. Current versions of RiTa (Version 2.0 was released in 2021) are implemented in both Java and JavaScript and integrate with p5.js, Processing, Node and Android.

Features

Usage examples 
// In JavaScript/Node

let RiTa = require('rita');
console.log(RiTa.rhymes('sweet'));

/*[
  'beat',    'beet',
  'cheat',   'cleat',
  'compete', 'complete',
  'conceit', 'concrete',
  'deceit',  'defeat', ...
]*/

let features = RiTa.analyze('The elephant took a bite!');
console.log(features);

/*{ 
  phones: 'dh-ah eh-l-ah-f-ah-n-t t-uh-k ey b-ay-t !',
  stresses: '0 1/0/0 1 1 1 !',
  syllables: 'dh-ah eh/l-ah/f-ah-n-t t-uh-k ey b-ay-t !',
  pos: 'dt nn vbd dt nn !',
  tokens: 'The elephant took a bite !'
}*/

// In Java/Processing

import rita.*;

void setup()
{
    size(100, 200);
    textSize(16);
    fill(0);
  
    String[] words = RiTa.rhymes("sweet");
    for (int i = 0; i < words.length; i++) {
        text(words[i], 20, 20 + i * 18);
    }
  
    println(RiTa.analyze("The elephant took a bite!"));
}

Related projects

Projects using RiTa

License 
RiTa is free, libre and open-source according to the GNU General Public License.

Notes 
The name RiTa is derived from the old Norse, meaning to mark, scratch, or scribble.

See also

References 
 
 
 
 , Limited edition artist book

External links 

Authoring systems
Free computer libraries
Free software
Cross-platform software
Educational programming languages
Java platform
2009 software
English language